Ventura is a Spanish surname. Notable people with the surname include:
André Ventura (born 1983), right-wing Portuguese politician
Denis Ventúra (born 1995), Slovak football midfielder 
Cassie Ventura (born 1986),  American singer, model, actress and dancer
Charlie Ventura (1916–1992), American tenor saxophonist
Elys Ventura (born 2001), New Zealand tennis player
Hugo Ventura (born 1988), Portuguese former professional footballer
Gian Piero Ventura (born 1948), Italian football manager
Giorgio Ventura, Italian mannerist painter
Jair Ventura (born 1979), Brazilian football manager and former player
Jesse Ventura (born 1951),  American politician, actor, and retired professional wrestler
João Ventura (born 1994), Portuguese footballer
Johnny Ventura (1940–2021), Dominican singer and band
Lino Ventura (born 1965), Italian television presenter
Lucas Ventura (born 1998), Brazilian professional footballer
Michael Ventura (born 1945), American novelist, screenwriter, film director, essayist and cultural critic
Ray Ventura (1908–1979), French jazz pianist and bandleader
Robin Ventura (born 1967), American former professional baseball third baseman and manager
Yolanda Ventura (born 1968), Spanish singer 
Yordano Ventura (1991–2017), Dominican professional baseball pitcher 

Spanish-language surnames